Marion Township is a township in Beaver County, Pennsylvania, United States. The population was 799 at the 2020 census. It is part of the Pittsburgh metropolitan area.

Geography
The township is located in northeastern Beaver County.

Surrounding neighborhoods
Marion Township has five borders, with Franklin Township to the north, New Sewickley Township to the south, North Sewickley Township to the west, and the Butler County neighborhoods of Zelienople to the east and Jackson Township to the southeast.

Demographics

As of the census of 2000, there were 940 people, 361 households, and 264 families residing in the township.  The population density was 91.5 people per square mile (35.3/km2).  There were 388 housing units at an average density of 37.8/sq mi (14.6/km2).  The racial makeup of the township was 98.19% White, 0.64% African American, 0.11% Pacific Islander, and 1.06% from two or more races. Hispanic or Latino of any race were 0.74% of the population.

There were 361 households, out of which 32.4% had children under the age of 18 living with them, 62.6% were married couples living together, 7.8% had a female householder with no husband present, and 26.6% were non-families. 21.9% of all households were made up of individuals, and about 7% had someone living alone who was 65 years of age or older.  The average household size was 2.60 and the average family size was 3.08.

In the township the population was spread out, with 24.5% under the age of 18, 7.9% from 18 to 24, 31.7% from 25 to 44, 24.6% from 45 to 64, and 11.4% who were 65 years of age or older.  The median age was 39 years. For every 100 females there were about 98 males.  For every 100 females age 18 and over, there were 96.1 males.

The median income for a household in the township was $43,365, and the median income for a family was $50,000. Males had a median income of $34,688 versus $24,327 for females. The per capita income for the township was $20,808.  About 7.3% of families and 10.0% of the population were below the poverty line, including 15.7% of those under age 18 and 8.5% of those age 65 or over.

References

External links
Township website

Populated places established in 1845
Townships in Beaver County, Pennsylvania